World of WearableArt (WOW) is an international design competition, attracting entries from more than 40 countries each year. The competition features wearable art entries, which are judged on durability, the safety and comfort of the models, and the impact of the design on the stage. During the three weeks of the competition, around 60,000 people attend the event in Wellington. In 2019, Sarah Foster-Sproull, was the festival's choreographer. The Gala show for 2020 was cancelled due to COVID-19 and was replaced by an exhibit in Wellington. It returned in 2022.

Exhibition 
The WOW museum (previously World of WearableArt and Classic Cars Museum) exhibits garments from the World of WearableArt Awards Show, along with a collection of around 140 classic cars.

References

External links 
 
 

Art museums established in 2001
Automobile museums in New Zealand
Art museums and galleries in New Zealand
Nelson, New Zealand
Wearable art
2001 establishments in New Zealand
Museums in the Nelson Region
Fashion museums
Events in Wellington